Pecado Original (English: Original Sin) is the third studio album by Mexican pop singer Ana Gabriel. It was released in 1987. Once again, she participated in the OTI Festival, this time in Lisbon with the song Ay Amor (Oh Love) which she achieved the third place.

Track listing
Tracks:
 Pecado Original 03:29 (Original by Roupa Nova)
 Ven, Ven 03:58 (Original by Marisol)
 Ven Cariño 03:31
 Por Culpa del Amor 03:58
 Amor con Desamor 03:38
 Amor 04:42
 Cruz Y Raya 03:34
 Ay Amor 03:23
 Noche a Noche 03:35
 Pensar en Ti 03:49

Singles
 Pecado original reached #14  on Hot Latin Songs.
"Ay amor" reached #1  on Hot Latin Songs.

Album chart
This release reached the #3 position in Billboard Latin Pop Albums.

References

1987 albums
Ana Gabriel albums